The following table lists the 10 National Natural Landmarks within Virginia in the eastern United States. They are administered by the United States National Park Service.

Virginia
Virginia geography-related lists
Natural history of Virginia
Protected areas of Virginia
.